Ali Kaya may refer to:
 Ali Kaya (athlete)
 Ali Kaya (serial killer)